Rajlakshmi O Srikanta is a 1958 Bengali drama film directed by Haridas Bhattacharya and produced by Kanan Devi based on the iconic and famous novel Srikanta of the legendary Sarat Chandra Chattopadhyay. This film was released in 1958 under the banner of Srimati Pictures. The film starring Uttam Kumar Suchitra Sen, Anil Chatterjee, Tulsi Chakraborty. Music direction of the film was done by Jnan Prakash Ghosh.

Plot
Srikanta goes to his friend Mahendra Rao's celebration where he meets Piyaribai. Although he can not recognizes her but Piyari knows him well as Srikanta was her childhood love. Piyari reveals the past fact how she become so from Rajlakshmi. She was forced by the wicked society, poverty and misfortune she had to take this unholy profession.

Cast
 Uttam Kumar as Srikanta
 Suchitra Sen as Rajlakshmi or Piyaribai
Anil Chatterjee as Mahendra
Tulsi Chakraborty as Ratan
Jahor Roy
 Shishir Batabyal as Doctor
Nripati Chattopadhyay
 Rajlakshmi Devi
 Haridhan Mukherjee
Santi Bhattacharya
Dwiju Bhawal

Music

References

External links
 

1958 films
1950s Bengali-language films
Bengali-language Indian films
Films based on works by Sarat Chandra Chattopadhyay
Films based on Indian novels
Films set in the 1910s
Indian black-and-white films
Indian drama films
1958 drama films